This is a list of destinations that Delta Express served.

North America

USA

Connecticut
 Hartford (Bradley International Airport)

District of Columbia
See Virginia for Washington, D.C. service

Florida
 Fort Lauderdale (Fort Lauderdale International Airport)
 Fort Myers (Southwest Florida International Airport)
 Jacksonville (Jacksonville International Airport)
 Orlando (Orlando International Airport) Hub
Tampa (Tampa International Airport)
West Palm Beach (Palm Beach International Airport)

Illinois
 Chicago (O'Hare International Airport)

Indiana
 Indianapolis (Indianapolis International Airport)

Kentucky
 Louisville (Louisville International Airport)

Massachusetts
 Boston (Logan International Airport) Focus City

Michigan
 Detroit (Detroit Metropolitan Wayne County Airport)

Missouri
 Kansas City (Kansas City International Airport)
 St. Louis (St. Louis International Airport)

New Jersey
 Newark (Newark International Airport)

New York
 Albany (Albany International Airport)
 Islip (Long Island MacArthur Airport)
 New York City (John F. Kennedy International Airport) Hub
 Syracuse (Syracuse Hancock International Airport)

North Carolina
 Raleigh (Raleigh-Durham International Airport)

Ohio
 Columbus (Port Columbus International Airport)
 Cleveland (Cleveland Hopkins International Airport)

Oklahoma
 Oklahoma City (Will Rogers World Airport)

Pennsylvania
 Allentown (Lehigh Valley International Airport)
 Erie (Erie International Airport)
 Pittsburgh (Pittsburgh International Airport)

Rhode Island
 Providence (T. F. Green Airport)

Texas
Austin (Austin-Bergstrom International Airport)

Virginia
Dulles/Washington, D.C. area (Washington Dulles International Airport)

Wisconsin
 Milwaukee (General Mitchell International Airport)

Delta Air Lines
Lists of airline destinations